The 1928 Copa del Rey Final was the 28th final of the Copa del Rey, the Spanish football cup competition. It was contested by Barcelona and Real Sociedad. As the match ended tied after extra time, two replay matches were needed to define a champion.

In the second replay, Barcelona defeated Real Sociedad 3–1 and won their eighth title.

Overview 
The first match was held on 20 May at El Sardinero. In that match, Barcelona goalkeeper Ferenc Plattkó left the field after injuring his head, which required stitches. As a result, forward Ángel Arocha replaced him. Nevertheless, midfielder Josep Samitier was also injured soon after, forcing Platko to return to the pitch despite his condition. Samitier would also return to the pitch after him.

Platko's performance in the final (and the action to save his goal that caused the injure) inspired poet Rafael Alberti (who had attended the match) to write his Ode to Platko in 1957, describing his catches and his injure.

Nevertheless, another football enthusiast and Real Sociedad supporter, Gabriel Celaya, wrote an ode stating that Platko was not responsible for his team defeat but a bad refereeing that included "ten penalties not awarded to Real Sociedad". After the match ended tied 1–1 after extra time, a replay match had to be played. Real Sociedad was considered favorite to win due to Barca's injured players. Argentine tango singer Carlos Gardel visited the injured players.

For the replay, Llorens replaced Platko. That match also ended 1–1 (after two extra time periods) so a second replay was scheduled for June 29. Finally, Barcelona won 3–1 with goals by Samitier, Sastre and Arocha. Zaldúa scored for Real Sociedad.

Match details

Final 

Note

Replay

Second replay

References

1928
1927–28 in Spanish football
FC Barcelona matches
Real Sociedad matches